This is a list of football stadiums in Thailand. Currently, stadiums with a capacity of 5,000 or more are included.

See also 
 List of Asian stadiums by capacity
 List of association football stadiums by capacity
 List of sports venues in Thailand

Stadiums
Football stadiums
Thailand